The 1900 United States presidential election in Wyoming took place on November 6, 1900, as part of the 1900 United States presidential election. State voters chose three representatives, or electors, to the Electoral College, who voted for president and vice president.

Wyoming was won by the President William McKinley (R–Ohio), running with the 33rd Governor of New York, Theodore Roosevelt, with 58.66 percent of the popular vote, against representative William Jennings Bryan (D–Nebraska), running with the 23rd Vice President Adlai Stevenson I, with 41.17 percent of the popular vote.

McKinley had previously lost Wyoming to Bryan four years earlier while Bryan would later go on to lose the state again to William Howard Taft in 1908.

Results

Results by county

See also
 United States presidential elections in Wyoming

Notes

References

Wyoming
1900
1900 Wyoming elections